The 2022 Arizona Wildcats softball team represents the University of Arizona in the 2022 NCAA Division I softball season.  The Wildcats are coached by Caitlin Lowe, who is in her first season with Arizona. They play their home games at Rita Hillenbrand Memorial Stadium and compete in the Pac-12 Conference.

Personnel

Roster

Coaches

Schedule

|-
! colspan=2 style=""| Regular Season: 33–20 (Home: 24–10; Away: 6–8; Neutral: 3–2)
|-
! colspan=2 style=""| Post Season: 6–2 (Home: 0–0; Away: 5–0; Neutral: 1–2)
|- valign="top" 
|

|- 
|

|- 
|

|- 
|

|- 
|

|- 
|- style="text-align:center;"
|   
|}
Source:

Rankings

References

Arizona
Arizona Wildcats softball seasons
Arizona Softball
Arizona
Women's College World Series seasons